Fernando Esparza Gonzalez (born September 15, 1983) is an American mixed martial artist who competes in the Welterweight division. A professional competitor since 2003, Gonzalez has also competed for the WEC, King of the Cage, Bellator MMA, Absolute Championship Akhmat, and Strikeforce. Also a successful competitor in Muay Thai, Gonzalez is the former WBC National Muay Thai Cruiserweight Champion.

Background
Born in Escondido, California, Gonzalez began boxing at the age of five. During high school, Gonzalez competed in football and began training in mixed martial arts after graduating at the age of 19.

Mixed martial arts career

Early career: WEC
Gonzalez made his MMA and WEC debut against Mike Castillo on October 17, 2003, at WEC 8. He was victorious via first-round TKO.

After going 7–3 in his next ten bouts, Gonzalez returned to the promotion when he faced Jimmy Dexter at WEC 20, defeating him via rear-naked choke submission.

He next faced Alex Stiebling at WEC 23 on August 17, 2006. He won the fight via TKO due to a doctor stoppage in the first round.

Gonzalez faced Brendan Seguin at WEC 25 on January 20, 2007. He lost the fight via unanimous decision.

In what would be his last fight for the promotion, Gonzalez faced Hiromitsu Miura at WEC 29 on August 5, 2007. He lost the fight via submission due to punches in the second round.

Strikeforce
Gonzalez made his Strikeforce debut at Strikeforce: Melendez vs. Masvidal on December 17, 2011. He faced Eddie Mendez and lost via split decision.

Bellator MMA
Gonzalez made his Bellator debut on July 25, 2014, when he faced Bellator season 6 welterweight tournament winner Karl Amoussou at Bellator 122. Despite coming in as an underdog, Gonzalez pulled off the upset, winning via unanimous decision.

In his second appearance for Bellator, Gonzalez was expected to face Justin Baesman at Bellator 127 on October 3, 2014. However, Karo Parisyan's opponent, Marius Žaromskis, was removed from their scheduled bout on the same card, so Gonzalez stepped in as a replacement. He won the fight via TKO in the first round. In his post-fight drug test, Gonzalez tested positive for Tetrahydrocannabinol (THC). As a result, Gonzalez was suspended for 30 days in the state of California by the CSAC and fined $315.

Gonzalez faced Marius Žaromskis at Bellator 132 on January 16, 2015. He won the fight by unanimous decision.

Gonzalez next faced Curtis Millender at Bellator 137 on May 15, 2015. He won the fight via submission in the third round, bringing his Bellator record to 4–0. After the fight it was revealed by the CSAC that Gonzalez tested positive for marijuana; his second violation while with the promotion.

On March 4, 2016, Gonzalez fought Gilbert Smith at Bellator 151. He won the fight by split decision.

Gonzalez fought Michael Page on November 19, 2016, at Bellator 165. He lost the fight via split decision.

After his first loss in the promotion, Gonzalez was scheduled to face former Bellator Welterweight Champion, Andrey Koreshkov, at Bellator 174 on March 3, 2017. However, an injury forced Koreshkov out of the bout. Instead, Gonzalez faced Brandon Girtz at the event and won via unanimous decision.

Gonzalez faced Brennan Ward at Bellator 182 on August 25, 2017. Originally a catchweight of 178 pounds, Gonzalez missed weight and came in at 180 pounds. He won the fight via a guillotine choke submission in the third round.

Gonzalez faced Lorenz Larkin in a catchweight bout at Bellator 193 on January 26, 2018. Gonzalez missed weight for the third time in a row. After surviving a late flurry of strikes in the third round, Gonzalez lost the fight via unanimous decision and was subsequently released from the promotion.

Personal life
Gonzalez and his wife have children.

Mixed martial arts record

|-
|Loss
|align=center| 29–20
|Maki Pitolo
|Decision (unanimous)
|Tuff-N-Uff 127
|
|align=center|3
|align=center|5:00
|Las Vegas, Nevada, United States
| 
|-
|Loss
|align=center| 29–19
| Sidiah Parker
| Decision (unanimous)
| NWFA 1: Retribution
| 
| align=center| 3
| align=center| 5:00
|Bentonville, Arkansas, United States
| 
|-
|Win
|align=center| 29–18
|Ty Freeman
|KO
|J Street Fights 1
|
|align=center|3
|align=center|0:14
|Bentonville, Arkansas, United States
|
|-
|Loss
|align=center| 28–18
|Abubakar Vagaev
|Decision (unanimous)
|ACA 100
|
|align=center|3
|align=center|5:00
|Grozny, Russia
|
|-
|Loss
|align=center|28–17
|Elias Silvério
|Decision (unanimous)
|ACA 96: Goncharov vs. Johnson
|
|align=center|3
|align=center|5:00
|Lodz, Poland
|Return to Welterweight.
|-
|Win
|align=center| 28–16
|Gabriel Checco
|Decision (split)
|CXF 17: March Madness
|
|align=center|3
|align=center|5:00
|Los Angeles, California, United States
|Middleweight bout.
|-
|Loss
|align=center| 27–16
|Piotr Strus
|Decision (split)
|ACB 87: Mousah vs Whiteford
|
|align=center|3
|align=center|5:00
|Nottinghamshire, England
|Middleweight bout.
|-
|Loss
|align=center| 27–15
|Lorenz Larkin
|Decision (unanimous)
|Bellator 193
|
|align=center|3
|align=center|5:00
|Temecula, California, United States
|Catchweight (180 lbs) bout; Gonzalez missed weight.
|-
|Win
|align=center| 27–14
|Brennan Ward
|Submission (guillotine choke)
|Bellator 182
|
|align=center|3
|align=center|1:02
|Verona, New York, United States
|Catchweight (180 lbs) bout; Gonzalez missed weight.
|-
| Win
| align=center| 26–14
| Brandon Girtz
| Decision (unanimous)
| Bellator 174
| 
| align=center| 3
| align=center| 5:00
| Thackerville, Oklahoma, United States
| Catchweight (174 lbs) bout; Gonzalez missed weight.
|-
| Loss
| align=center| 25–14
| Michael Page
| Decision (split)
| Bellator 165
| 
| align=center| 3
| align=center| 5:00
| San Jose, California, United States
| 
|-
| Win
| align=center| 25–13
| Gilbert Smith
| Decision (split)
| Bellator 151
| 
| align=center| 3
| align=center| 5:00
| Thackerville, Oklahoma, United States
| 
|-
| Win
| align=center| 24–13
| Curtis Millender
| Submission (guillotine choke)
| Bellator 137
| 
| align=center| 3
| align=center| 1:14
| Temecula, California, United States
| 
|-
| Win
| align=center| 23–13
| Marius Žaromskis
| Decision (unanimous)
| Bellator 132
| 
| align=center| 3
| align=center| 5:00
| Temecula, California, United States
| 
|-
| Win
| align=center| 22–13
| Karo Parisyan
| TKO (punches)
| Bellator 127
| 
| align=center| 1
| align=center| 1:43
| Temecula, California, United States
| 
|-
| Win
| align=center| 21–13
| Karl Amoussou
| Decision (unanimous)
| Bellator 122
| 
| align=center| 3
| align=center| 5:00
| Temecula, California, United States
|Welterweight bout.
|-
| Loss
| align=center| 20–13
| David Mitchell
| TKO (punches)
| WFC 8: Avila vs. Berkovic
| 
| align=center| 3
| align=center| 1:45
| Sacramento, California, United States
| 
|-
| Loss
| align=center| 20–12
| Max Griffin
| Decision (split)
| WFC 7: Griffin vs. Gonzalez
| 
| align=center| 5
| align=center| 5:00
| Sacramento, California, United States
| 
|-
| Win
| align=center| 20–11
| Kenny Ento
| Decision (unanimous)
| Gladiator Challenge: Showdown
| 
| align=center| 3
| align=center| 5:00
| Woodlake, California, United States
| 
|-
| Win
| align=center| 19–11
| Lucas Gamaza
| Decision (unanimous)
| Red Canvas: Art of Submission 3
| 
| align=center| 3
| align=center| 5:00
| Stockton, California, United States
| 
|-
| Win
| align=center| 18–11
| Theodore Whitfield
| TKO (punches)
| Gladiator Challenge
| 
| align=center| 1
| align=center| 1:02
| San Diego, California, United States
| 
|-
| Loss
| align=center| 17–11
| Eddie Mendez
| Decision (split)
| Strikeforce: Melendez vs. Masvidal
| 
| align=center| 3
| align=center| 5:00
| San Diego, California, United States
| 
|-
| Loss
| align=center| 17–10
| Joe Williams
| Decision (split)
| Respect in the Cage
| 
| align=center| 5
| align=center| 5:00
| Pomona, California, United States
| 
|-
| Loss
| align=center| 17–9
| Brent Cooper
| Decision (unanimous)
| Respect in the Cage
| 
| align=center| 3
| align=center| 5:00
| Pomona, California, United States
| 
|-
| Win
| align=center| 17–8
| Nick Zarate
| TKO (punches)
| Gladiator Challenge: Never Quit
| 
| align=center| 1
| align=center| 0:47
| San Jacinto, California, United States
| 
|-
| Win
| align=center| 16–8
| Frank Avant
| Submission (rear-naked choke)
| Gladiator Challenge: High Impact
| 
| align=center| 1
| align=center| 0:21
| Pauma Valley, California, United States
| 
|-
| Loss
| align=center| 15–8
| Tony Lopez
| Submission (rear-naked choke)
| KOTC: Storm
| 
| align=center| 5
| align=center| 1:48
| Lake Elsinore, California, United States
| 
|-
| Win
| align=center| 15–7
| Larry Mays
| TKO (elbows)
| Gladiator Challenge: Venom
| 
| align=center| 1
| align=center| 1:53
| Pauma Valley, California, United States
| 
|-
| Loss
| align=center| 14–7
| Tony Lopez
| Submission (rear-naked choke)
| KOTC: Misconduct
| 
| align=center| 2
| align=center| 1:37
| Highland, California, United States
| 
|-
| Win
| align=center| 14–6
| Hector Urbina
| Submission (guillotine choke)
| KOTC: Fight Nite @ The Shrine
| 
| align=center| 1
| align=center| 2:10
| Los Angeles, California, United States
|Welterweight bout.
|-
| Loss
| align=center| 13–6
| Jay Martinez
| TKO (punches)
| MMA Xtreme 15
| 
| align=center| 2
| align=center| 3:11
| Mexico City, Mexico
| 
|-
| Loss
| align=center| 13–5
| Hiromitsu Miura
| Submission (punches)
| WEC 29
| 
| align=center| 2
| align=center| 3:35
| Las Vegas, Nevada, United States
| 
|-
| Win
| align=center| 13–4
| Joe Atoe
| TKO (punches)
| MMA Xtreme 12
| 
| align=center| 1
| align=center| 2:31
| Mexicali, Mexico
| 
|-
| Win
| align=center| 12–4
| Jay Carter
| Decision (unanimous)
| X-1: Extreme Fighting 2
| 
| align=center| 3
| align=center| 3:00
| Honolulu, Hawaii, United States
| 
|-
| Loss
| align=center| 11–4
| Brendan Seguin
| Decision (unanimous)
| WEC 25
| 
| align=center| 3
| align=center| 5:00
| Las Vegas, Nevada, United States
| 
|-
| Win
| align=center| 11–3
| Umar Luv
| Submission (injury)
| KOTC: Destroyer
| 
| align=center| 2
| align=center| 0:28
| San Jacinto, California, United States
| 
|-
| Win
| align=center| 10–3
| Alex Stiebling
| TKO (doctor stoppage)
| WEC 23
| 
| align=center| 1
| align=center| 2:35
| Lemoore, California, United States
| 
|-
| Win
| align=center| 9–3
| Jimmy Dexter
| Submission (rear-naked choke)
| WEC 20
| 
| align=center| 1
| align=center| 4:09
| Lemoore, California, United States
|Return to Middleweight.
|-
| Loss
| align=center| 8–3
| Danny Higgins
| Submission (rear-naked choke)
| Extreme Wars 2: X-1
| 
| align=center| 2
| align=center| N/A
| Honolulu, Hawaii, United States
| 
|-
| Win
| align=center| 8–2
| Ray Lizama
| Decision (unanimous)
| KOTC 63: Final Conflict
| 
| align=center| 2
| align=center| 5:00
| San Jacinto, California, United States
| 
|-
| Win
| align=center| 7–2
| Aaron Torres
| Submission (punches)
| KOTC 58: Prime Time
| 
| align=center| 1
| align=center| 1:33
| San Jacinto, California, United States
| 
|-
| Win
| align=center| 6–2
| Sidney Silva
| Decision (unanimous)
| Extreme Wars: X-1
| 
| align=center| 3
| align=center| 5:00
| Honolulu, Hawaii, United States
|Return to Welterweight.
|-
| Loss
| align=center| 5–2
| Miguel Gutierrez
| Submission (armbar)
| KOTC: Mortal Sins
| 
| align=center| 1
| align=center| 1:42
| Primm, Nevada, United States
| 
|-
| Win
| align=center| 5–1
| Reggie Orr
| Decision (majority)
| KOTC 49: Soboba
| 
| align=center| 2
| align=center| 5:00
| San Jacinto, California, United States
|Welterweight bout.
|-
| Win
| align=center| 4–1
| Reggie Orr
| Submission (injury)
| KOTC 44: Revenge
| 
| align=center| 2
| align=center| 2:38
| San Jacinto, California, United States
| 
|-
| Win
| align=center| 3–1
| Travis Goodman
| KO (punch)
| KOTC 41: Relentless
| 
| align=center| 1
| align=center| 0:25
| San Jacinto, California, United States
|Return to Middleweight.
|-
| Win
| align=center| 2–1
| Scott Sepulveda
| TKO (punches)
| KOTC 39: Hitmaster
| 
| align=center| 1
| align=center| 3:28
| San Jacinto, California, United States
|Welterweight debut.
|-
| Loss
| align=center| 1–1
| Eric Escobedo
| Decision
| Pit Fighting Championship
| 
| align=center| 3
| align=center| 5:00
| California, United States
| 
|-
| Win
| align=center| 1–0
| Mike Castillo
| TKO (punches)
| WEC 8
| 
| align=center| 1
| align=center| 1:27
| Lemoore, California, United States
|

Kickboxing record

|-
|-  bgcolor= #FFBBBB
| 2015-09-19 || Loss ||align=left| Paul Daley || Bellator MMA & Glory: Dynamite 1 || San Jose, California, USA || Decision (unanimous) || 3 || 3:00 || 0–1
|-
|-
| colspan=9 | Legend:

References

Living people
1983 births
American male mixed martial artists
American sportspeople in doping cases
Doping cases in mixed martial arts
Welterweight mixed martial artists
Mixed martial artists utilizing boxing
People from Escondido, California
People from Murrieta, California
People from Menifee, California